This is a list of women who have held the Miss Nepal title.
Mrs Nepal world 2021 is Diksha kc from lalitpur

Miss Nepal titleholders

  In 1998; Jyoti Pradhan, Miss Nepal 1998 had been stripped off her title after she didn't manage to fulfill the responsibilities of the title holder and the 1st Runner Up, Niru Shrestha was given the main title.

Notes
 Age at time of winning Miss Nepal

Winners' gallery

Full Results
Miss Nepal has specific titles and crowns for each runner-ups. To distinguish the runner-ups at the national competition from the global level, Miss Nepal has included the titles of "Miss Nepal Earth" and "Miss Nepal International" before the names of the 1st & 2nd Runner Ups. Since 2011 onwards, the host announced the names of the 3rd and 4th runner ups.

Since 2017, Miss Nepal has announced Top 7 Finalists with 1st Runner Up as Miss Nepal Earth (2nd Place), 2nd Runner Up as Miss Nepal International (3rd Place), 3rd Runner Up as Miss Nepal Asia Pacific International (4th Place) and 3 Runner Ups (5th-7th Place).

References

External links
 Miss Nepal official website

Miss Nepal titleholders
Miss Nepal titleholders
Miss Nepal titleholders